The National Committee for a Free Germany (or NKFD) was a German anti-Nazi organisation that operated in the Soviet Union during World War II.

History 
The rise of the Nazi Party to power in Germany in 1933 led to the outlawing of the Communist Party of Germany (KPD) and persecutions of its members, many of whom fled to the Soviet Union.

With the German invasion of the Soviet Union in Operation Barbarossa, German prisoners of war began to fall into Soviet hands. Attempts to establish an anti-Nazi organization from these POWs met with little success, since most of them still believed in the final victory of the Wehrmacht.

With the German defeat at the Battle of Stalingrad, the number of German POWs increased and their belief in a victorious Germany weakened, hence they were more open to the idea of membership of an anti-Nazi organization.

At the beginning of June 1943, Alfred Kunella and Rudolf Herrnstadt began writing a Committee manifesto. This text praised historical figures from the Kingdom of Prussia who had allied with Imperial Russia against Napoleon in the German Campaign of 1813; figures such as Heinrich Friedrich Karl vom und zum Stein, Carl von Clausewitz and Graf Yorck were depicted as exemplary Germans. The National Committee for a Free Germany (NKFD) was founded in Krasnogorsk, near Moscow on 12 July 1943; its president was the exiled German communist writer Erich Weinert, with his deputies Lieutenant Heinrich Graf von Einsiedel and Major Karl Hetz. Its leadership consisted of 38 members, including 28 Wehrmacht POWs and 10 exiled communists including Friedrich Wolf.

League of German Officers 

After several failed attempts to recruit officers into the NKFD, it was suggested by Lieutenant-Colonel Alfred Brette that a special organization for officers be set up so that they would not have to come into contact with communists and common soldiers.

Two months after the founding of the NKFD, the League of German Officers (Bund Deutscher Offiziere, or BDO) was founded; its leader was General Walther von Seydlitz-Kurzbach. The main task of the BDO was to deliver propaganda aimed at the German armed forces. A number of officers held as Soviet prisoners of war eventually joined the BDO, the most prominent of them being Field-Marshal Friedrich Paulus, commander of the Sixth Army captured at the Battle of Stalingrad. The BDO later merged with the NKFD.

Ideology 

Although the NKFD operated in the Soviet Union and consisted partly of communists, it used conservative symbols and ideology. For example, the old flag colors of Imperial Germany (black, white and red) were used instead of the Weimar German (black, red and gold), as they were expected to be more popular among officers and soldiers of the conservative Wehrmacht. The stated goal of the NKFD organisation was a return to the borders of 1937, the opening of negotiations for peace, and the deposing and punishment of the Nazi leadership. It also called for the preservation of the power of the Wehrmacht. The NKFD believed that German civilians and soldiers had to place the interests of the German nation above those of their Nazi leaders.

As the war progressed and it became increasingly clear that an anti-Nazi coup would not occur, the NKFD's ideological line became more leftist, and eventually identical to that of the KPD.

Activity 
NKFD and BDO activity focused on propaganda and had their own newspaper and radio station. They sent leaflets to German soldiers on the Eastern Front and to POWs in the Soviet camps. Red Army Major Lev Kopelev described the joint psychological warfare at Grudziądz in March 1945 by the Red Army and members of the NKFD. General Seydlitz-Kurzbach offered to raise an anti-Hitler army from NKFD and BDO members to fight against the Nazis, but the Soviet side rejected their offer.

Some NKFD members were attached to front-line Soviet units to interrogate German POWs and for propaganda purposes. Others fought behind the German lines alongside Soviet partisan units. Towards the very end of the war so-called Seydlitz-Troops were sent to the German lines in uniform with orders to blend in with the defenders and spread confusion. Some rejoined their former comrades and others followed their orders. Many were caught and executed. As the Red Army entered Germany, some NKFD members were appointed as officials in the local government of the Soviet occupation zone.

Publications 
Freies Deutschland was the weekly newspaper of the NKFD, published from 1943 to 1945.

Branch groups 
Anti-Fascist Committee for a Free Germany

Post-war 
After the defeat of Nazi Germany, NKFD members mostly returned to the Soviet occupation zone in Germany and had a key role in building the German Democratic Republic. Some BDO members had a key role in building the National People's Army, but others like Seydlitz were prosecuted as war criminals.

Notable members 

Anton Ackermann
Wilhelm Adam
Johannes R. Becher
Gerhard Bechly
Willi Bredel
Heinrich Graf von Einsiedel
Wilhelm Florin
Peter Gingold
Heinz Kessler
Alfred Kurella
Arno von Lenski
Wolfgang Leonhard
Vincenz Müller
Friedrich Paulus
Wilhelm Pieck
Theodor Plievier
Hermann Rentzsch
Willy Riedel
Walther von Seydlitz-Kurzbach
Walter Ulbricht
Gustav von Wangenheim
Erich Weinert
Otto Winzer
Friedrich Wolf
Markus Wolf

See also 

National Committee for the Liberation of Yugoslavia
National Committee of the Republic of Estonia
Supreme Committee for the Liberation of Lithuania
Committee for the Liberation of the Peoples of Russia
Japanese People's Emancipation League
Italian resistance movement
Lev Kopelev
Free Albania National Committee

Notes and references

Further reading 

Lev Kopelev, To Be Preserved Forever ("Хранить вечно"), 1976

Organizations disestablished in 1943
German resistance to Nazism
 
Communist Party of Germany
Organizations based in Moscow
Wehrmacht
Psychological warfare
Soviet propaganda organizations
Politics of East Germany